Ihor Myronovych Shymechko (Ukrainian: Ігор Миронович Шимечко; born 27 May 1986, in Lviv) is a Ukrainian weightlifter.

Career
He competed at the 2008 and 2012 Summer Olympics in the +105 kg event, finishing in 5th and 6th place respectively.

Shymechko was European champion in 2009 and won the silver medal in 2011 in the +105 kg division. He competed at the 2016 Summer Olympics in the Men's +105 kg.

Since 1 May 2017, he has been married to Ukrainian weightlifter Yuliya Kalina.

References

Sportspeople from Lviv
Ukrainian male weightlifters
Olympic weightlifters of Ukraine
Weightlifters at the 2008 Summer Olympics
Weightlifters at the 2012 Summer Olympics
1986 births
Living people
Weightlifters at the 2016 Summer Olympics
20th-century Ukrainian people
21st-century Ukrainian people